The Joint Stock Commercial Bank for Investment and Development of Vietnam, commonly known as BIDV, is a Vietnamese state-owned bank in Vietnam. It is the country's biggest bank by assets ($72 billion USD) as of June 2021. According to the United Nations Development Programme report on the 100 largest enterprises in Vietnam, BIDV came in at the 4th position after Agribank, VNPT, and EVN.

BIDV received Asia Risk Magazine's House of the Year Award for being at the forefront of the country's economic development by modernising its risk management and developing new financial products such as energy derivatives hedges.

History
BIDV was established on 26 April 1957 as the Bank for Construction of Vietnam (Ngân hàng Kiến thiết Việt Nam), under which name it operated until 24 June 1981, at which point it changed its name to the Bank for Investment and Construction of Vietnam  (Ngân hàng Đầu tư và Xây dựng Việt Nam). It adopted its present name on 14 November 1990.

In January 2007, the Vietnamese government announced that it would sell a minority stake in the BIDV and three other banks. In March of that same year, they sought the government's permission to invest in highway projects. In September, they announced that they would form Vietnam's first aircraft finance group in Hanoi in a joint venture with Vietnam Airlines, PetroVietnam, and Vietnam Post and Telecommunication.

In November 2019 BIDV officially signed a strategic cooperation agreement with Hana Bank and announced the Korean bank as its foreign strategic shareholder who owns 15% of its charter capital. This is the biggest M&A deal with a strategic investor in Vietnam's banking industry

See also

 List of banks in Vietnam
Bank for Investment and Development of Cambodia

References

External links 
 Official home page

Banks of Vietnam
Banks established in 1957
Government-owned companies of Vietnam
Vietnamese brands